Anthiveyilile Ponnu is a 1982 Indian Malayalam-language film, directed by Radhakrishnan (RK) and produced by Panchami Enterprises. The film stars Kamal Haasan, Lakshmi, Jagathy Sreekumar and Kalpana. The film has musical score by Salil Chowdhury. The film was dubbed and released into Tamil-language as Ponmaalai Pozhudhu. The film was adapted from novel of same name by Perumpadavam Sreedharan.

Cast 
 Kamal Haasan
 Lakshmi
 Jagathy Sreekumar
 Kalpana
 Sankaradi
 Sukumaran
 Nithya
 M. A. Nishad (Child actor)

Soundtrack 

The music was composed by Salil Chowdhury and the lyrics were written by O. N. V. Kurup.

References

External links 
 

1982 films
1980s Malayalam-language films
1980s romance films
Indian romance films
Films based on Indian novels